The April 1981 United Kingdom snow storm was an exceptionally late snow event that primarily affected Great Britain between 23 and 26 April 1981. The snow event was of particular note for its lateness in the season and its intensity. Also associated with the pressure system was low temperatures.

Snowfall totals
Totals across southern England, Wales, the Midlands and the North West widely exceeded . On the 25th alone,  were reported to have fallen across southern and western England and Wales. In total,  was reported to have fallen in Gloucestershire. Also, there was level snow of  around the Peak District with  drifts reported in strong winds.

Temperatures 
Along with a snow, temperatures were exceptionally below normal for this stage in April. At Birmingham, the temperature didn't exceed  between the 24th and 26th and in some places, the temperature remained permanently below .

Impacts and aftermath 
The snow thawed very quickly, this led to major flooding in areas such as the east Midlands. In some places it was the worst flooding since the thaw of March 1947. There was also widespread disruption to power supplies, farming (particularly on Dartmoor), particularly livestock, and traffic. And also the Snake Pass in Derbyshire was closed because of the risk of an avalanche.

References 

Snow in the United Kingdom